Child's Play 2 is a 1990 American slasher film and the direct sequel to Child's Play, written by Don Mancini and directed by John Lafia, one of the co-writers of the first film. It is the second installment in the Child's Play franchise and set two years after the first film; the plot follows Charles Lee Ray (better known as Chucky) continuing his pursuit for Andy Barclay, who was placed in foster care, and transferring his soul into him after being resurrected. Alex Vincent and Brad Dourif reprised their roles while Christine Elise, Jenny Agutter, Gerrit Graham and Grace Zabriskie joined the cast.

Child's Play 2 was released on November 9, 1990, exactly two years after the first film was released, and grossed over $35 million on a budget of $13 million. It was followed by a sequel, Child's Play 3, 9 months later.

Plot
Two years after the first film, the Play Pals Corporation, which produces the Good Guy dolls, recovers from the negative publicity and reassembles Chucky to reassure its stockholders that there was nothing actually wrong with the doll. During the process, a power surge electrocutes one of the assembly line workers. Mr. Sullivan, the executive of the company, orders his assistant Mattson to cover up the accident and dispose of Chucky, unaware that he has been revived.

Meanwhile, Andy Barclay, now eight years old, has been in foster care ever since the murders, his mother having been institutionalized for backing up Andy's story about the killer doll. Andy goes to live with foster parents Phil and Joanne Simpson, who are also fostering Kyle, a cynical, street smart teenage girl. Chucky discovers Andy's whereabouts by using Mattson's car phone to call Grace Poole, the manager of Andy's foster center, before suffocating Mattson with a plastic bag.

Chucky invades the home by destroying and burying another Good Guy doll called "Tommy" and replacing it with himself. Andy begins to bond with Kyle after the two are punished for an heirloom Chucky destroyed. That night, Chucky ties Andy to his bed and reveals himself, but Kyle enters the room before he can complete the voodoo chant to possess him. Kyle doesn't believe Andy's assertions about Chucky while Phil and Joanne blame Kyle and throw Chucky in the basement. Chucky realizes that he is becoming human after suffering a nosebleed. The next day, Chucky secretly follows Andy to school and defaces his homework, resulting in Andy being assigned detention. Chucky kills Andy's teacher Miss Kettlewell by stabbing her with a pump and then beating her to death with a yardstick, but Andy manages to escape. Andy tries to warn his foster parents about Chucky, but Phil refuses to believe him and considers returning him to the foster center.

That night, Andy sneaks into the basement to destroy Chucky with an electric knife, but the doll overpowers him. When Phil arrives to investigate the commotion, Chucky trips him, causing Phil to fall and break his neck. Joanne immediately blames Andy and sends him back to the foster center. Kyle discovers "Tommy" buried outside and realizes Andy was telling the truth all along. She rushes to warn Joanne, only to discover that Chucky has already killed her. Chucky ambushes Kyle and forces her to drive him to the foster center. There, Chucky clears the building by pulling the fire alarm. He stabs Grace to death and forces Andy to take him to the Play Pals factory to perform the voodoo chant. Kyle pursues them to the factory but is unable to find them before Chucky knocks Andy unconscious and completes the ritual.

However, the spell fails as Chucky has spent too much time in his doll body and is now permanently trapped. Infuriated, Chucky chases Andy and Kyle through the factory, intent on killing them both. Kyle slams a gate shut on Chucky's hand, which Chucky tears off and replaces with a makeshift blade. After Chucky murders a factory technician, Kyle and Andy manage to trap him in a giant assembly line machine that mutilates his body, seemingly killing him. However, Chucky manages to escape the machine by cutting off his own legs and attacks again, knocking out Kyle. Andy is able to defeat him a second time by opening a valve, showering Chucky with a lethal amount of hot molten plastic. After saving the unconscious Kyle from a conveyor belt, the two approach the half-melted Chucky, who suddenly attacks them again.

During the struggle, Kyle shoves a high-pressure air hose into his mouth, inflating his head until it explodes, decapitating him. Andy and Kyle exit the factory, unsure of where to go.

Cast

 Alex Vincent as Andy Barclay
 Brad Dourif as the voice of Chucky
 Ed Gale (in-suit performer)
 Christine Elise as Kyle
 Jenny Agutter as Joanne Simpson
 Gerrit Graham as Phil Simpson
 Grace Zabriskie as Grace Poole
 Peter Haskell as Haskell Sullivan
 Beth Grant as Elizabeth Kettlewell
 Greg Germann as Mattson
 Edan Gross as Tommy Doll
 Charles Meshack as Van Driver

Production
United Artists purchased the script to the original Child's Play partially because UA President Tony Thomopoulis and MGM/UA Communications Chairman Lee Rich believed that it had the potential for multiple sequels. The sequel was in pre-production and was set to begin filming on October 15, 1989, when UA President Richard Berger told producer David Kirschner that the film was put on hold as the studio was about to be acquired by the Australian group Qintex, whose director Christopher Skase intended to ban the studio from producing horror films.

Paramount Pictures, Warner Bros., Columbia Pictures, 20th Century Fox, The Price Company, Carolco, New Line Cinema, Walt Disney Studios, and Universal Pictures expressed interest in picking up the film rights to the series and sequel, with Universal winning the rights bid, after Steven Spielberg assisted Universal's Sid Sheinberg in convincing Kirschner to accept it.

Originally the film was intended to open with a courtroom scene of a jury sentencing Karen Barclay to a mental institution for insisting that Chucky was alive, and both Catherine Hicks and Chris Sarandon were intended to reprise their roles as Karen and Detective Mike Norris from the first film. However, their scenes were cut from the scripts because of budgetary constraints, and as a result of their omission the film is much shorter than the other installments in the series. The courtroom scene would be recycled as the ending of Curse of Chucky in 2013. It also would have contained a scene where Chucky's remains were held in a police evidence locker alongside Jason Voorhees and Michael Myers's masks, an idea which came to be reused in Bride of Chucky in 1998.

Principal photography began on November 6, 1989 with a $12 million budget. Unlike the first film which was mostly shot on-location in Chicago, most of the second film was shot in Universal Studios Lot in Universal City, California. Brad Dourif recorded all of his dialogue as Chucky in advance, which allowed his words to match up with his facial movements better than in the first film. Kevin Yagher returned to do the special effects and puppetry, directing several scenes of the film himself. The International Alliance of Theatrical Stage Employees picketed the shoot to demand that the production company stop using non-union employees, with the crew voting to sign a union contract in January 1990 shortly before filming wrapped. Graeme Revell, whose only scoring experience was the 1989 Australian psychological horror film Dead Calm, was hired to compose the music after lying to the studio that he had composed an orchestral composition before. Kevin Carlson, Van Snowden, and N. Brock Winkless IV were credited as part of the puppeteers of Chucky.

Novelization 
A tie-in novelization to the film was later written by Matthew J. Costello. The author added in some of his own plot scenes exclusive to the novel, such as going deeper into Andy Barclay and Chucky's past. Chucky is characterized to have an absent father and his abusive mother being a dwarf. Chucky got teased a lot because of this and later strangled his mother to death. Also, Chucky was put in special classes when he was younger. During the scene at the factory, Chucky sees a bunch of Good Guy dolls and wishes that he could bring them to life to do his bidding. This was partially used as the plot of the film Cult of Chucky.

Reception

Box office
The film opened at number one in the US with an opening weekend gross of $10,718,520 from 1,996 screens in the US. The film grossed a total of $28,501,605 in the US and an additional $7.3 million internationally for a worldwide gross of $35.8 million.

Critical response
Rotten Tomatoes gives the film an approval rating of 40% based on 15 reviews.  Evan Dickson of Bloody Disgusting, in describing how it surpasses the original film, wrote, "Child's Play 2 manages to strip away all artifice and still manage to be an effective slasher."

Variety wrote, "Child's Play 2 is another case of rehashing the few novel elements of an original to the point of utter numbness." Gene Siskel gave the film zero stars out of four, calling it "A vicious, ugly little thriller." On Siskel and Ebert's Worst of 1990 show, Siskel further criticised the film, accusing director John Lafia of "prostituting himself" and rhetorically asking the audience "who was this trash made for and would you want to sit next to them in a theater?"

Kevin Thomas of the Los Angeles Times thought the original was "a terrific one-of-a-kind thriller," but "Not so the sequel. It's an all-out horror film—handsomely produced but morbid and not in the least amusing to watch." Richard Harrington of The Washington Post called it "an inevitable sequel that's not as good as its progenitor, but better than most movies with the numbers 2 through 8 in their titles."

Audiences response
Audiences polled by CinemaScore gave the film an average grade of "A−" on an A+ to F scale. According to the creator, Don Mancini, and the cast of the Child's Play franchise, Child's Play 2 is considered the favorite film of Chucky by fans.

Home media
Child's Play 2 was first released on VHS by MCA/Universal Home Video in North America on April 11, 1991. The film was later released on DVD in 1999 and bundled with the fourth film Bride of Chucky. This released on DVD by Universal Pictures Home Entertainment on October 22, 2002. It was released in multiple collections, such as:
 The Chucky Collection (alongside Child's Play 3 and Bride of Chucky), released on October 7, 2003.
 Chucky – The Killer DVD Collection (alongside Child's Play 3, Bride and Seed of Chucky), released on September 19, 2006.
 Chucky: The Complete Collection (alongside Child's Play  and 3, Bride, Seed and Curse of Chucky), released on October 8, 2013.
 Chucky: Complete 7-Movie Collection (alongside Child's Play  and 3, Bride, Seed, Curse and Cult of Chucky), released on October 3, 2017.
Child's Play 2 was released on 4K Ultra HD by Scream! Factory on August 16, 2022. This release included a new 4K scan from the original camera negative, a new Dolby Atmos track and several interviews recorded in 2022 with creator Don Mancini, actor Alex Vincent, producer David Kirschner, actress Christine Elise, actress Beth Grant, and executive producer Robert Latham Brown.

Sequels
The film was followed by Child's Play 3 in 1991, Bride of Chucky in 1998, Seed of Chucky in 2004, Curse of Chucky in 2013, Cult of Chucky in 2017, and the TV series Chucky in 2021.

References

External links

 
 
 
 

1990 films
1990 horror films
1990s slasher films
American sequel films
American slasher films
1990s English-language films
Child's Play (franchise) films
Films set in 1990
Films set in Chicago
Films set in factories
Films shot in Chicago
Films shot in California
Films shot in Los Angeles
Films about adoption
Films about Voodoo
Universal Pictures films
Films scored by Graeme Revell
Films directed by John Lafia
1990s American films